Blotto was an American rock band from Albany, New York known for mixing music and humor. They formed in 1978 from the Star Spangled Washboard Band, a comedy jug band whom The New York Times  described as "reminiscent of collision between the Earl Scruggs Review and the Three Stooges." Blotto's music combined new wave and soul/R&B however it had comedic themes. It began as a pick-up band in Saratoga Springs at a club then known as 17 Maple Ave. (later The Metro), with three Washboard Band alumni (who took the stage names Bowtie Blotto, Sergeant Blotto, and Broadway Blotto), plus a drummer and a bassist (Lee Harvey Blotto, and Cheese Blotto). They were joined by Blanche Blotto, who contributed vocals and keyboards and inspired the band's drumhead lady logo.  They began to amass a following and played in the New York City area at clubs such as The Ritz, SNAFU, Eighty-Eight, and My Father's Place. DJ Vin Scelsa of WNEW-FM picked up on their initial recording of "I Wanna Be A Lifeguard," which soon became the theme song of the Jones Beach Lifeguards. Their songs were played on the Dr. Demento Show, and they appeared on television's Uncle Floyd Show. They toured frequently and were popular primarily in the northeastern United States, especially among college students.

After releasing two EPs on their own Blotto Records label, they produced an early music video for "I Wanna Be A Lifeguard" with video production students at SUNY Albany. The video was played on MTV's very first day on the air in 1981 and continued in frequent rotation. This exposure helped the band produce their album Combo Akimbo, which was released with assistance from Peter Pan Records, as well as a "Video 45" on VHS from Sony with three videos of Blotto songs that also received wide exposure from airplay on MTV, including "Metalhead," with Donald "Buck Dharma" Roeser from Blue Öyster Cult on lead guitar. Blotto worked with producer Bob Clearmountain on one song on the album. North Lake Sound Chief Engineer, Chris Cassone, produced and engineered the rest of Combo Akimbo. Cassone was also working with Roeser  at the time and suggested he hear the song with an homage Blotto had recorded, "Metalhead." Because of a one-time mistaken erasure of a guitar track, he was dubbed "Eberhard Blotto."

The group disbanded in 1984 with the players pursuing more profitable interests. Drummer Lee Harvey Blotto (Paul Rapp) graduated from Albany Law School, became an attorney specializing in intellectual property law, and continued to play with the band as "F. Lee Harvey Blotto" (a pun on the names of famous lawyer F. Lee Bailey and JFK assassin Lee Harvey Oswald). Bassist "Cheese Blotto" (Keith Stephenson) died suddenly in October 1999 of cardiomyopathy brought on by a liver condition.

All of Blotto's studio recordings (with one exception, the song "Bud ... Is After Us") were reissued on a 1994 compact disc compilation, Collected Works. In 1999, the band released Then More Than Ever, a CD comprising previously unreleased live concert recordings, excerpts from a 1982 appearance on the "BBC College Concert" radio series, and tracks recorded for the never-completed follow-up album to Combo Akimbo.

The band reunited for occasional concerts in the Albany area, including an appearance at the 2008 4th of July celebration at Empire State Plaza, and several shows in 2011 at local festivals. On August 6, 2015, the band opened for Blue Öyster Cult at an "Alive at Five" concert in Albany.

Founding member and lead vocalist Sergeant Blotto (real name Greg Haymes) died on April 10, 2019.

In March 2020, Blotto was inducted into the Capital Region Thomas Edison Music Hall of Fame.

Members
Group members went by pseudonyms on their recordings and in performance. 
The members of the original lineup were:
Paul Jossman, aka "Bowtie Blotto" (guitar, vocals). Born 1948 in Detroit, Michigan.
Bill Polchinski, aka "Broadway Blotto" (guitar, vocals). Born 1950 in the Bronx, New York.
Keith Stephenson, aka "Cheese Blotto" (bass guitar) 1956–1999. Born in Ballston Spa, New York.
Greg Haymes, aka "Sergeant Blotto" ("Sarge") (vocals, percussion; Director, Blotto Graphic Arts Dept.) 1948-2019. Born in Kenmore, New York.
Paul Rapp, aka "Lee Harvey Blotto" (drums). Born June 13, 1955 in Batavia, New York.
Helena Binder, aka Blanche Blotto (keyboards, vocals; 1978-1980). Born 1955 in Schenectady, New York.

Other members
Johnny Blotten (drums; 1978–1979)
Scott Blott (sax; 1978)
Chevrolet Blotto (vocals and keyboards; 1980–1981)
Ink Blotto (roadie; 1980–1982) aka Jay Bloomrosen
Phil Auteliblotto (guitar; 1990-1991)
Juan Pablo Blotto (1990–1995)
Riff Chord Blotto (lead guitar; 1979-1980)
Staccato Blotto (Rob Sabino - keyboards 1980)

Discography
 Hello! My Name is Blotto. What's Yours? (EP, Blotto Records) (1980)
 Across and Down (EP, Blotto Records) (1981)
 When the Second Feature Starts (Single, Blotto Records) (1981)
 Metalhead (Sony Video 45, VHS) (1982)
 Combo Akimbo (LP, Blotto Records) (1983)
 Blotto (Canadian compilation) (LP, Attic Records) (1984)
 I Wanna Be A Lifeguard (PVC Records) (1988)
 Collected Works* (CD, One Way Records) (1992)
 Then More Than Ever (CD, One Way Records) (1999) (previously unreleased tracks)
 Blotto - Play Something Good! The Definitive Video History (2005)
 
In addition to their inclusion on the CD Collected Works, Blotto's cover version of Lou Christie's "Lightning Strikes" appears on the compilation LP Hudson Rock, and "Metalhead" appears on the compilation LP Metal For Breakfast.

References

External links
Official site
MySpace Page

Rock music groups from New York (state)
Musical groups from Albany, New York
Musical groups established in 1979
American comedy musical groups